Alfred Hoblitzelle Clifford (July 11, 1908 – December 27, 1992) was an American mathematician born in St. Louis, Missouri who is  known for Clifford theory and for his work on semigroups. He did his undergraduate studies at Yale and his PhD at Caltech, and worked at MIT, Johns Hopkins, and later Tulane University. The Alfred H. Clifford 
Mathematics Research Library at Tulane University is named after him.

Publications

External links
 Alfred H. Clifford Mathematics Research Library
 
 
 

20th-century American mathematicians
1908 births
1992 deaths
People from New Orleans
Tulane University faculty
California Institute of Technology alumni
Scientists from Missouri
Mathematicians from Missouri